Hylerpeton is an extinct genus of leponspondyl amphibian belonging to the family Gymnarthridae from the late Carboniferous period.

The nominal species "Hylerpeton" longidentatum Dawson, 1876 was considered possibly non-microsaurian by Steen (1934) and Carroll (1966), and was eventually recognized as a member of Aistopoda and renamed Andersonerpeton longidentatum by Pardo and Mann (2018) as the type species of a new genus.

References

Gymnarthrids
Carboniferous amphibians of North America
Fossil taxa described in 1862